Actihema is a genus of moths belonging to the subfamily Tortricinae of the family Tortricidae.

Species
Actihema fibigeri Aarvik, 2010
Actihema hemiacta (Meyrick, 1920)
Actihema jirani Aarvik, 2010
Actihema msituni Aarvik, 2010
Actihema simpsonae Aarvik, 2010

See also
List of Tortricidae genera

References

 , 2010: Review of East African Cochylini (Lepidoptera, Tortricidae) with description of new species. Norwegian Journal of Entomology 57 (2): 81-108. Abstract: .
 , 2005: World catalogue of insects volume 5 Tortricidae.
 , 2011: Diagnoses and remarks on genera of Tortricidae, 2: Cochylini (Lepidoptera: Tortricidae). Shilap Revista de Lepidopterologia 39 (156): 397-414.
 , 1993: Cochylini (Lepidoptera: Tortricidae) of the Ethiopian Region. Acta Zoologica Cravociensia 36: 137-159 (147).

External links
tortricidae.com

Cochylini
Tortricidae genera
Taxa named by Józef Razowski